Frontier Myanmar is a news and business magazine published in Yangon, Myanmar, owned by Black Knight Media Co. Ltd which also runs a content marketing agency called Black Knight Media Group. It operates an English language magazine, an English language website, and a Burmese language website. Frontier Myanmar mainly focuses on local politics and business.

Background
Frontier was established by Sonny Swe, a cofounder of The Myanmar Times and the son of a former Military Intelligence officer, who was jailed for his work at the newspaper from 2004 to 2013 after the purge of junta-era Prime Minister Khin Nyunt. Prior to Frontier, Sonny Swe was an investor in Mizzima Media Group alongside business magnate Serge Pun, but both men withdrew from the board in January 2015 citing financial pressures and management conflict with managing director Soe Myint.

Launched in July 2015, Frontier is one of the first privately funded English language news publications to open in Myanmar since the government of Thein Sein abolished the country's repressive censorship regime in 2012. Along with Mizzima, it is one of only two English language news weeklies in Myanmar.

Many of Frontier’s staff have been drawn from other prominent news organisations in Myanmar, including The Myanmar Times, The Irrawaddy, Mizzima and 7Day News. Thomas Kean, the magazine's editor-in-chief, was previously editor of The Myanmar Times from 2010–2016.

The publication has received numerous regional awards, including a Human Rights Press Award and a Society of Publishers in Asia Award.

Myitsone Dam
In July 2016, Frontier ran an editorial by Joern Kristensen, a development consultant and former member of the Mekong River Commission, suggesting that the government of Aung San Suu Kyi cancel the controversial and widely unpopular China-backed Myitsone Dam project in Myanmar's north. Later that month, the government-run Kyemon newspaper endorsed Kristensen's proposal and called for a "permanent suspension" of the project, in the first clear indication that the government was considering a cancellation of the $800 million dam since it took office that March.

Danny Fenster

Danny Fenster is an American reporter who joined Frontier Myanmar in August 2020. After the 2021 Myanmar coup d'état Fenster was detained by authorities on 24 May 2021. Fenster was charged with two crimes, was convicted, and was sentenced to 11 years in jail in November 2021, before he was released to return to the U.S.

See also
 Danny Fenster
 Media of Burma
 The Myanmar Times
 Mizzima News

References

External links
 Frontier Myanmar (English edition)
 Frontier Myanmar (Burmese edition)

Burmese magazines
Burmese news websites